San Miguel, Ecuador may refer to:

 San Miguel, Bolívar, Bolívar Province
San Miguel de Ibarra, Imbabura Province
San Miguel de Salcedo, Cotopaxi Province
San Miguel de los Bancos, Pichincha Province
 San Miguel de Cayapas, Esmeraldas Province